My Name is Brain Brian (stylized as My name is Brain Brian) is a children's novel written by the author of the Pony Pals series, Jeanne Betancourt. First published in 1993, it is a contemporary story which focuses on studying and dyslexia.

Characters

Toomey family

Sharon Center School

Classmates

Bullies

Doctors

Plot

References

American children's novels
1993 American novels
Dyslexia in fiction
Novels set in schools
1993 children's books